The UEFA European Championship is the main football competition of the men's national football teams governed by UEFA (the Union of European Football Associations). Held every four years since 1960, in the even-numbered year between World Cup tournaments, it was originally called the UEFA European Nations Cup, changing to the current name in 1968. Starting with the 1996 tournament, specific championships are often referred to in the form "Euro 2008" or whichever year is appropriate.
Prior to entering the tournament all teams other than the host nations (which qualify automatically) compete in a qualifying process.

France is one of the most successful nations at the  European Championship, having won two titles in 1984 and 2000, and finishing as runners-up in 2016. The team is just below Spain and Germany, who have won three titles each. France hosted the inaugural competition in 1960 and have appeared in ten tournaments, tied for fourth-best. The team won their first title on home soil in 1984 and were led by Ballon d'Or winner Michel Platini. In 2000, the team, led by FIFA World Player of the Year Zinedine Zidane, won its second title in Belgium and the Netherlands. The team's worst result in the competition was a first-round elimination in 1992 and 2008.

Overall record

*Denotes draws including knockout matches decided via penalty shoot-out.
**Gold background colour indicates that the tournament was won.
***Red border colour indicates that the tournament was held on home soil.

Winning campaigns

List of matches

1960 European Nations' Cup

Final tournament

Semi-finals

Third place play-off

Euro 1984

Group stage

Knockout stage

Semi-finals

Final

Euro 1992

Group stage

Euro 1996

Group stage

Knockout stage

Quarter-finals

Semi-finals

Euro 2000

Group stage

Knockout stage

Quarter-finals

Semi-finals

Final

Euro 2004

Group stage

Knockout phase

Quarter-finals

Euro 2008

Group stage

Euro 2012

Group stage

Knockout phase

Quarter-finals

Euro 2016

Group stage

Knockout phase

Round of 16

Quarter-finals

Semi-finals

Final

Euro 2020

Group stage

Knockout phase

Round of 16

Goalscorers

Notes

References

External links
France at UEFA

 
Countries at the UEFA European Championship